The president pro tempore of the United States Senate (also president pro tem) is the second-highest-ranking official of the United States Senate. Article I, Section Three of the United States Constitution provides that the vice president of the United States, despite not being a senator, is the president of the Senate. It also establishes that the Senate must choose a president pro tempore to act in his or her absence:

In practice, neither the vice president nor the president pro tempore usually presides; instead, the duty of presiding officer is rotated among junior senators of the majority party to give them experience in parliamentary procedure.

The president pro tempore is third in the line of succession to the presidency, after the vice president and the Speaker of the House of Representatives and ahead of the Secretary of State.

Since 1890, the most senior senator in the majority party has generally been chosen to be president pro tempore, and holds the office continuously until the election of another president pro tempore. During most of the 62nd Congress, following William Frye's resignation on April 27, 1911, five senators—Augustus Bacon, Charles Curtis, Jacob Gallinger, Henry Cabot Lodge, and Frank Brandegee—alternated as president pro tempore. 

Since the office was created in 1789, 92 individuals, from 39 of the 50 states, have served as president pro tempore of the Senate. The current president pro tempore is Patty Murray of Washington, who assumed office on January 3, 2023, at the start of the 118th Congress. In 2001, the honorary title of president pro tempore emeritus was created, and it has been given to a senator of the minority party who has previously served as president pro tempore. This title is currently held by Chuck Grassley of Iowa.

Every president pro tempore has been a member of a political party or faction; the number affiliated with each is:

Presidents pro tempore

Notes

President pro tempore emeritus
In 2001, the honorary title of president pro tempore emeritus was created. It has subsequently been bestowed upon a senator of the minority party who has previously served as president pro tempore.

See also
 Dean of the United States Senate
 History of the United States Senate
 Seniority in the United States Senate
 List of current presidents of legislatures, presiding officers of legislative assemblies worldwide

References

Presidents pro tempore of the United States Senate
United States Senate, Presidents pro tempore
President pro tempore